Duflos is a French surname. Notable people with this surname include:

 Adolph Ferdinand Duflos (1802–1889), French pharmacist
 Claude Duflos (1665–1727), French engraver
 Huguette Duflos (1887–1982), French actress
 Patrick Duflos (born 1965), French volleyball player

See also
 Duflo
 Duflot